This is a list of Railway Electrification Systems in Japan:
Overhead line power supply, unless otherwise noted. The rail system consists of the following:

  of  Scotch gauge, all electrified;
  of  narrow gauge, all electrified.

Electrification systems used by the Japan Railways Group, Japan's formerly state-owned operators, are 1,500 V DC and 20 kV AC for conventional lines and mini Shinkansen and 25 kV AC for Shinkansen. Electrification at 600 V DC and 750 V DC are also seen in private lines and non-rail based transit systems. The frequency of the AC power supply is 50 Hz in Eastern Japan and 60 Hz in Western Japan.

DC electrified

200 V

440 V

600 V

1,067 mm gauge

1,435 mm gauge

Other gauges

750 V

1,500 V

1,067 mm gauge

1,435 mm gauge

other gauges

AC electrified

600 V 50 Hz

600 V 60 Hz

20 kV, 50 Hz

20 kV, 60 Hz

25 kV, 50 Hz

25 kV, 60 Hz

References

 
Ele
Japan